Otoancorin is a protein found in the vertebrate inner ear, on the sensory epithelia where it connects to the gel matrix.

Otoancorin is found in the cochlea, utricule, saccule, and under the cupulae on the surface of apical dells in the sensory epithelia.

In humans the gene that encodes otoancorin is called OTOA. It is on chromosome 16p12.2 and contains 28 exons. A recessive mutation in this gene called IVS12+2T>C results in deafness. The human protein has 1,153 amino acids.

In the mouse, this protein has 1088 amino acids. In mice otoancorin is needed to attach the tectorial membrane to the inner hair cells in the cochlea.

References